Anna Sarah "Sophie" Souwer (born 29 June 1987) is a Dutch rower who won three silver medals at the European championships in 2013–2016. She placed sixth in the eight at the 2016 Summer Olympics.

Souwer and her brothers were raised by relatives as her mother died and her father was unable to look after them. Her nickname Sophie comes from the novel Sophie's Choice. She studied nursing at Hanze University of Applied Sciences and has a bachelor's degree in obstetrics from University of Midwifery Amsterdam Groningen.

References

External links

 

1987 births
Living people
Dutch female rowers
Olympic rowers of the Netherlands
Rowers at the 2016 Summer Olympics
Rowers at the 2020 Summer Olympics
People from Westervoort
World Rowing Championships medalists for the Netherlands
20th-century Dutch women
21st-century Dutch women
Sportspeople from Gelderland